Claudia Lösch (born 19 October 1988) is a successful Austrian Paralympian and alpine monoskier. She won gold medals in the slalom and super slalom at the 2010 Winter Paralympics in Vancouver. She also won a silver medal at the Alpine skiing at the 2014 Winter Paralympics – Women's Super-G.

Life
Lösch was born in 1988 in Vienna and at early age she was left paraplegic in 1994. Losch was brought up in Neupölla and graduated from her school in Horn in 2007 before studying political science in Innsbruck.

Losch took up alpine sports where she has been successful in the "women sitting" events. She has won five medals at Paralympics including two gold medals. She has also completed successfully at the world championships. Losch competed in the World Cup in Canada.

Results
 European Cup overall victories in 2003/04, 2004/05 and 2005/06.
 Overall World Cup victories in 2008/09 and 2009/10
 Alpine Ski Championships in disabled sports in 2009 South Korea: silver in giant slalom and super combined,
 Alpine Ski Championships in disabled sports in 2011 Sestriere, (Italy): Bronze in Downhill and Super-G, Silver in the super combined, Silver in slalom and giant slalom
 2006 Winter Paralympics Turin (Italy): bronze in the downhill,
 2010 Winter Paralympics Vancouver (Canada): gold in super-G and slalom, silver in the Super Combine.
 2014 Winter Paralympics Sochi (Russia): silver in super-G and giant slalom

References

External links

 Lösch at 2010 Paralympics, YouTube
 

1988 births
Living people
Sit-skiers
Austrian female alpine skiers
Paralympic gold medalists for Austria
Paralympic silver medalists for Austria
Paralympic bronze medalists for Austria
Alpine skiers at the 2006 Winter Paralympics
Alpine skiers at the 2010 Winter Paralympics
Medalists at the 2014 Winter Paralympics
Medalists at the 2010 Winter Paralympics
Medalists at the 2006 Winter Paralympics
Paralympic alpine skiers of Austria
Alpine skiers at the 2014 Winter Paralympics
Paralympic medalists in alpine skiing
People with paraplegia
21st-century Austrian women